Badman's Territory is a 1946 American Western film starring Randolph Scott. It was followed by the loose sequels Return of the Bad Men (1948) and Best of the Badmen (1951).

Plot
Just north of Texas and west of the Oklahoma border is "Badman's Territory", a region not yet governed by statehood. This is where Jesse James and brother Frank head after a train robbery, along with their partner, Coyote.

Mark Rowley, a lawman, and his deputy brother Johnny are after the James gang. So is a ruthless U.S. marshal named Hampton, who shoots anybody who gets in his way. He even wings Johnny Rowley just to take the newly captured Coyote away from him.

In the town of Quinto, newspaper editor Henryetta Alcott is a crusader for law and order. Mark takes an immediate liking to her. He also helps Belle Starr's horse win a big race.

Johnny's injuries mend, but the Dalton Gang persuades Johnny to go bad and join them. Mark tries to dissuade him. He shoots a man named McGee who stole his horse. Hampton puts up wanted posters on both Rowleys.

Henryetta spreads the word that Oklahoma has annexed this territory into the union. Mark is appointed a "regulator" and proposes marriage to Henryetta before he rides to Coffeyville, Kansas, where the Daltons are about to pull a job with Johnny as part of the gang.

When Johnny is shot and killed, Mark and Coyote bury him in the woods where they overhear Hampton and his men planning to ride to Quinto. After evacuating the town, Rowley meets Hampton and his men alone and is taken into custody. Shortly thereafter, Coyote shows up and is shot by Hampton after refusing to testify against Rowley.

The story ends with Hampton being exposed and Rowley being found not guilty before riding off in a wagon with  Henryetta Alcott.

Cast

Randolph Scott as Mark Rowley
George "Gabby" Hayes as Coyote
Ann Richards as Henryetta Alcott
Ray Collins as Colonel Farewell
James Warren as John Rowley
Morgan Conway as Marshall Bill Hampton
Virginia Sale as Meg
John Halloran as Hank McGee
Andrew Tombes as Doc Grant
Richard Hale as Ben Wade
Harry Holman as Hodge
Chief Thundercloud as Chief Tahlequah
Lawrence Tierney as Jesse James
Tom Tyler as Frank James
Steve Brodie as Bob Dalton
Phil Warren as Grat Dalton
William Moss as Bill Dalton
Nestor Paiva as Sam Bass
Isabel Jewell as Belle Starr
Chet Brandenburg as Townsman (uncredited)
Budd Buster as Doc's Friend (uncredited)
George Chesebro as Johnny (uncredited)
Neal Hart as Townsman (uncredited)
Harry Harvey, Sr. as Stationmaster (uncredited)
Robert Homans as Judge (uncredited)
Ben Johnson as Deputy Marshall (uncredited)
Ethan Laidlaw as Lt. Patton (uncredited)
Elmo Lincoln as Dick Broadwell (uncredited)
Theodore Lorch as Citizen's Committee Member (uncredited)
Wilbur Mack as Cattle Baron (uncredited)
Kermit Maynard as Carson (uncredited)
Bud Osborne as Deputy Dan Mercer (uncredited)
Emory Parnell as Bitter Creek (uncredited)
'Snub' Pollard as Town Barber (uncredited)
Jason Robards, Sr. as Alert Coffeyville Citizen (uncredited)
Buddy Roosevelt as Lt. Lake (uncredited)
Harry Semels as Bettor (uncredited)
Robert J. Wilke as Deputy Marshall (uncredited)

Production
Filming started September 1945.

Reception
The film made a profit of $557,000.

References

External links
 
 
 
 

1946 films
1946 Western (genre) films
American Western (genre) films
American black-and-white films
1940s English-language films
Films scored by Roy Webb
Films directed by Tim Whelan
RKO Pictures films
Revisionist Western (genre) films
1940s American films